Tylodexia is a genus of parasitic flies in the family Tachinidae.

Species
Tylodexia precedens (Walker, 1859)

References

Dexiinae
Diptera of Asia
Tachinidae genera
Taxa named by Charles Henry Tyler Townsend